Aristolochia tuberosa is a species of plant in the family Aristolochiaceae. It is endemic to China.

References

tuberosa
Endemic flora of China
Endangered flora of Asia
Taxonomy articles created by Polbot